Tanveer Abbasi was a Sindhi-language poet.

Bibliography 

His books include:
 رڳون ٿيون رباب                                        (شاعري)      1958ع
 شعر                                                      (شاعري)    1978 ع
 جي ماريا نه موت                    ( ويٽ نامي ناول جو ترجمو)    1973ع 
 ٻاراڻا ٻول ( چونڊ ۽ ترتيب: 1973ع )
 شاه لطيف جي شاعري ( تحقيق: جلد I 1976ع )
 شاهه لطيف جي شاعري ( جلد ٻيو ، 1985ع )
 شاهه لطيف جي شاعري ( 3 جلد گڏ ، 1989ع )
 سج تريءَ هيٺان ( شاعري: 1977ع )
 جديد سنڌي شاعري ( چونڊ ۽ ترتيب: 1981ع )
 خير محمد هيسباڻيءَ جو ڪلام ( ترتيب: 1983ع )
 نانڪ يوسف جو ڪلام ( ترتيب: 1982ع )
 ڏوري ڏوري ڏيهه ( سفرنامو: 1984ع )
 هيءَ ڌرتي ( شاعري: 1985ع )
 Sachal Sarmast
 منهن تنين مشعل ( خاڪا: 1990ع )
 تنوير چئي ( شعري ڪليات:1989ع )
 ترورا ( ادبي مضمون ، خاڪا ، يادگيريون ، سفرنامو: 1988ع )
 ساجن سونهن سرت ( شاعري: 1996ع )
 سپني کان سهڻي ساڀيا ( تقريرون ۽ ليڪچر: 2002ع )
 سچل جو رسالو ( ترتيب:اڻ ڇپيل )
 مون کي اڳتي وڃڻو آهي ( سفرناما: 2000ع ) .

External links
 Dr. Tanveer Abbasi Corner
 Tanveer Abbasi Article on Sindhipedia
tanveer-abbasi.org

References

Sindhi-language poets
Sindhi people
1934 births
1999 deaths